The ula (dance) is an ancient Tongan group dance, already reported by early European navigators like captain Cook. It is also known as fahai-ula (split dance), which may be degenerated to fahaiula. Traditionally it is performed after an ʻotuhaka. It is still danced nowadays, although less popular than its descendant the tauolunga.

Lyrics

The oldest parts seem to be from Sāmoan origin:

 Oiau, sia langi ula; i iē
 fai mai sia tauolunga. io!
 
 Tulopa he iau moe; io ē!
 vasaleva iau moe; io!
 
 Sina vai tava ā ē
 he iē, ā ē.
 
 Sina vai tafe lou lonā.
 io, io, he lou lonā.
 
 Tunotuna oe Ale-le-sā,
 manuia oe saualuma.
 
 Laulau tui Vaea ē,
 Vaea lau mānaia.

These parts are from the beginning of the 20th century:

 Tonga, Tonga ē,
 tulituli faiva, he tuli faiva ē
 pei kau mua pei kau mai
 ke tau kalofi kuo tau e langi
 tulituli faiva, he tuli faiva ē.
 
 Tonga, Tonga ē,
 tulituli faiva, he tuli faiva ē
 ko e faiva ni ko hoto kakala
 o lau taanga pea fola haka
 tulituli faiva, he tuli faiva ē.
 
 Tonga, Tonga ē,
 tulituli faiva, he tuli faiva ē
 kuo ke meai sioto founga
 fiemālie tuku ke u ula
 tulituli faiva, he tuli faiva ē.

And then there are still more variants.

Execution
The name split dance comes from the habit that the performers split up in two (or more) groups, one entering the stage from the left, the other from the right, until the two meet in the centre and merge into one or more rows. The performers are always girls, it is rare that boys will join.

The dance movements are in essence very simple and limited. Most of the work, making supple, beautiful postures, is done by the hands and the head. The body remains quite stiff, and except for an occasional step or a kneeling, the legs are not much used either.

The dress of the girls is like that of the tauolunga, although the red dress is here most popular.

References

Dances of Tonga
Group dances